Hollies is the Hollies' third studio album for Parlophone. It is also referred to as Hollies '65 to differentiate it from the similarly titled 1974 album. It went to No. 8 in the UK album charts. Originally available in mono only, it was reissued in stereo under the title Reflection in 1969. In 1997, British EMI put both mono and stereo versions of this album onto a single CD.

Of the twelve tracks on this album, only "So Lonely" was issued on 45 in Great Britain; even then, it was the B-side to the 1965 hit "Look Through Any Window", a song recorded concurrent with the rest of this album. On the original album, only five of the twelve songs are band originals, attributed at the time to the pseudonym "L. Ransford" but actually written by Allan Clarke, Tony Hicks and Graham Nash.  The rest were covers. In Scandinavia "Very Last Day" and "Too Many People" were issued on 45, with the former becoming a major hit in Sweden.

The song "Put Yourself in My Place" (written by Clarke, Hicks and Nash) was also recorded by Episode Six and became their 1966 debut single.

Track listing

Note: All songs written by the bandmembers were attributed to the pseudonym "L. Ransford".

Hear! Here! (US version)

More than a year after the release of the Hollies' US debut album, Here I Go Again, the success of "Look Through Any Window" (The Hollies' first Top 40 hit in the US) inspired Imperial Records, the Hollies' US label, to finally release another Hollies LP.

In November 1965, Imperial released Hollies, with a slightly different track listing, as Hear! Here! in the US. Imperial removed "Fortune Teller" and "Mickey's Monkey" from Hollies and added the singles "I'm Alive" and "Look Through Any Window". The track listing was then re-arranged so that the singles started each side.

Although the album is clearly a US repackaging of the Hollies album, the cover uses the photo from the UK In The Hollies Style LP, which was never released in the USA.

"Mickey's Monkey" later appeared in 1966 on the forthcoming "Bus Stop" album, but "Fortune Teller" was never issued in the US until the 1990s. In 2010, the mono version of this LP was reissued on 180 gram vinyl in the USA by Sundazed Records.

Track listing

Love N' Flowers (Canadian version)

In 1967, the Hollies transferred the US and Canadian rights to all new material to Epic Records. Unlike Imperial Records in the US, Capitol Canada had opted not to issue a version of Hollies when it was released in 1965, choosing instead to release an edited version of the almost year-old album In The Hollies Style. However, even though all of the Hollies' master rights were owned by Capitol Records' parent company, EMI, Capitol Canada decided to counterprogram against The Hollies' first Epic release, Evolution. In November 1967, one month after the release of Evolution, Capitol Canada repackaged Hollies with a "flower child" cover (a later picture of The Hollies standing amidst tree branches under a title bar with flowered wallpaper, as shown) and issued it under the name Love N' Flowers. Capitol Canada had previously released two tracks from Hollies ("Very Last Day" and "Too Many People") on the Canadian version of Bus Stop, and a third track ("Mickey's Monkey") had been included on In The Hollies Style, leaving nine tracks from the album unissued in Canada. Capitol Canada added one of the tracks that it did not use from the UK version of In The Hollies Style ("I Thought of You Last Night") to make up the ten songs included on Love N' Flowers.

This was the last new release in the Hollies catalogue from Capitol Canada.

Track listing
Side 1
 "You Must Believe Me"
 "Put Yourself in My Place"
 "Down the Line"
 "That's My Desire"
 "Lawdy Miss Clawdy"

Side 2
 "When I Come Home to You"
 "Fortune Teller"
 "So Lonely"
 "I've Been Wrong"
 "I Thought of You Last Night" (Ralph Freed) – 2:18

Personnel
The Hollies
Allan Clarke – vocals, harmonica
Bobby Elliott – drums
Eric Haydock – bass guitar
Tony Hicks – lead guitar, vocals
Graham Nash – rhythm guitar, vocals

Additional personnel
Ron Richards – production
Alan Hawkshaw – piano on "Put Yourself in My Place"

References

External links
The Hollies Official Website.

1965 albums
The Hollies albums
Albums produced by Ron Richards (producer)
Parlophone albums
EMI Records albums